Dean Michael Sinclair (born 17 December 1984) is an English former professional footballer who played as a midfielder.

Sinclair came through the Norwich City youth academy and was promoted to the club's first team in 2002. He struggled to make an impact and joined Barnet two years later. He made 125 appearances for the club before joining Charlton Athletic, where he again struggled to hold down a place in the first team and eventually spent time on loan with Cheltenham Town and Grimsby Town as well as briefly returning to Barnet for a month. In 2010, he returned to Grimsby on a permanent basis but the season ended with a loan at Cambridge United. Following his release from Grimsby in 2011 he went on to have spells with Arlesey Town, Hayes & Yeading and Lowestoft Town before signing with Woking in August 2012. He was released just a few months later and signed with Sutton United in February 2013.

Whilst with Barnet, Sinclair was capped 5 times by the England C team, scoring one goal.

Career

Norwich City
Sinclair career started at Norwich under Nigel Worthington, where he came through the youth system. Worthington promoted Sinclair to the club's first team at the start of the 2002–03 season. With the club playing in the First Division Sinclair made his debut on 25 February 2003 in the club's 1–0 away defeat against Gillingham where he played from the start before being replaced by Ian Henderson in the 83rd minute. On 15 March he came on for Mark Rivers in the 89th minute of the club's 2–0 win over Coventry City at Carrow Road. Sinclair was kept on by The Canaries during the 2003–04 season but failed to make a single appearance and was only named on the substitute's bench a handful of times. In the summer of 2004 Worthington released Sinclair after 16 months without any first team football.

Barnet
Sinclair signed with Conference National side Barnet in August 2004. He made his debut 14 August 2004 in the club's 3–1 victory over Forest Green Rovers. During this season the club earned promotion to the Football League with Sinclair playing in 39 league matches scoring 9 goals the first of them coming against Northwich Victoria on 28 August 2004. During the 2005–06 season Sinclair scored against Manchester United at Old Trafford in the League Cup on 26 October 2005, whilst Barnet were 3–0 down, they eventually lost 4–1. He decided to leave Barnet at the end of the 2006–07 season, as his contract was up.

Charlton Athletic
In the summer of 2007, after a successful trial period, Sinclair joined Alan Pardew's Charlton Athletic for a fee of £125,000. The club had recently been relegated from the Premier League and were preparing for their first season in the second tier of English football since being promoted in 2000. Sinclair made his Addicks debut on 14 August 2007 in the club's 2–0 League Cup win over Swindon Town with Sinclair making a 78th minute appearance as a replacement for Andy Reid. Sinclair's next appearance would be in the second round of the same competition where he started and scored a 4th-minute goal against Luton Town, however after extra time Charlton lost the match 3–1. In October 2007, he joined Cheltenham Town on a month's loan, rejoining Cheltenham on another months loan in August 2008. On 8 January Sinclair signed a one-month loan deal with Mike Newell's Grimsby Town, which was later extended. Injury curtailed his stay at Blundell Park and he returned to Charlton. In November 2009, Sinclair rejoined Barnet on loan. He scored against Crewe Alexandra, but was sent off against Northampton Town and his loan spell was not renewed. On 28 January, he re-joined Grimsby Town on loan for the rest of the 2009–10 season. Grimsby suffered relegation from the Football League in May 201. Sinclair returned to Charlton but was released from the club having only played two games in three seasons at The Valley, none of which were league appearances.

Grimsby Town
On 29 November 2010, after being without a club for the first four months of the 2010–11 season, Sinclair approached former club Grimsby Town to take a look at him. Sinclair began training with Grimsby again with the hope of a permanent deal in mind. Sinclair signed a deal until the end of the 2010–11 season on 9 December. Sinclair made his third debut for The Mariners in the club's 3–0 FA Trophy victory over Redditch United. Following the sacking of Neil Woods in February 2011, and despite scoring three goals in ten games Sinclair was loaned out to Cambridge United until the rest of the season on 25 March 2011 following the arrival of joint-manager's Rob Scott and Paul Hurst. and made his debut on 2 April against Altrincham. Sinclair returned to Grimsby at the end of the 10–11 season and was released.

Arlesey Town and Hayes & Yeading United
In August 2011 Sinclair played for Southern League Premier Division side Arlesey Town in a friendly against Kettering Town. He then joined the club on a short-term deal, playing 11 times scoring 1 goal.

On 4 November Sinclair moved back up the football pyramid by signing with Conference National side Hayes & Yeading United. Sinclair played two games for the club, scoring once before returning to Arlesey on loan.

Lowestoft Town, Woking and Sutton United
Sinclair joined Lowestoft Town on 16 February 2012. Sinclair joined Woking F.C. on 7 August 2012. Sinclair left Woking on 8 January 2013, having played 21 times in the league, scoring once in a 5–1 defeat against former club Grimsby Town.

In February 2013, Sinclair signed with Conference South side Sutton United. He left the club following the 2013–14 season, in which Sutton reached the playoffs with a second-place finish, but were knocked out in the semi-finals by eventual winners Dover Athletic.

Eastbourne Borough

Following his departure from Sutton, Sinclair joined league rivals Eastbourne Borough.

Hampton and Richmond Borough

Sinclair was released by Eastbourne towards the end of the 2014–15 season and subsequently went on to sign for Hampton & Richmond Borough.

Honours

Barnet
Conference National Winner 2004–05

Hampton & Richmond Borough
Isthmian League Premier Division Winner 2015–16

Career statistics

References

External links
Dean Sinclair player profile at cafc.co.uk

Career information at ex-canaries.co.uk

1984 births
Living people
Sportspeople from St Albans
English footballers
Association football midfielders
Norwich City F.C. players
Barnet F.C. players
Charlton Athletic F.C. players
Cheltenham Town F.C. players
Grimsby Town F.C. players
Cambridge United F.C. players
Arlesey Town F.C. players
Hayes & Yeading United F.C. players
Lowestoft Town F.C. players
Woking F.C. players
Sutton United F.C. players
Eastbourne Borough F.C. players
Hampton & Richmond Borough F.C. players
English Football League players
National League (English football) players
Isthmian League players
England semi-pro international footballers